Philip II de Croÿ (1496–1549) was Seigneur de Croÿ, Count of Porcéan and first Duke of Aarschot.
 
Philip belonged to the powerful House of Croÿ. He was the eldest son of Henry de Croy, and Charlotte de Châteaubriand. His grandfather was Philip I of Croy, his uncle William II de Croÿ, chief tutor and First Chamberlain to Charles V, and his younger brothers were William, Archbishop of Toledo, and Robert, Prince-Bishop of Cambrai.

Philippe II de Croÿ succeeded to the County of Porcéan upon his father's death in 1514. In 1521 he inherited the titles of his uncle William : amongst others, Duke of Soria and Archi, and Count of Beaumont.
   
Like his predecessors, he was Governor of Hainault and Senior Knight of the Order of the Golden Fleece, but it is as Charles V's general that he is best remembered. He fought against the French in the Italian War of 1521–1526, and played an important role in the conquest of Tournai (1521).

On 1 April 1533 Charles V created Philippe ("our cousin", as he styled him) Duke of Aarschot and Grandee of Spain First Class. Earlier, he had become Marquess of Renty and exchanged the lordship of Longwy in Lorraine for that of Havré, which his descendants would develop as a family nest.

Marriage and children

Philippe's first wife was a distant cousin, Anne de Croÿ (1502–1539), Princess of Chimay, daughter of Charles I de Croÿ and great granddaughter of Jean II de Croÿ, Count of Chimay.
 
They had:

 Charles II (1522–1551), 2nd Duke of Aarschot, 3rd Prince of Chimay, 3rd Count of Beaumont
 Louise (1524–1585), married Maximilian of Burgundy, Marquis de Vere et de Vlissingen (died 1558) and John of Burgundy, Lord of Sommelsdijk (died 1586).
 Philippe III (1526–1595), 3rd Duke of Aarschot, 4th Prince of Chimay, 4th Count of Beaumont
 William (1527–1565), 2nd Marquis de Renty, one daughter Anne de Croy d. 1609
 Antoine (1530–1530)
 Louis (1533–1533)

Nine years after Anna's death, Philippe married Anna of Lorraine (1522–1568), daughter of Antoine, Duke of Lorraine and widow of René of Châlon.
They had one son, born after Philippe's death:
 Charles Philippe de Croÿ, Marquis d’Havré (1549–1613), had issue

References

Sources

x

External links

genealogy (in French)

1496 births
1549 deaths
Phillippe II
Philippe
Knights of the Golden Fleece
Grandees of Spain